Feldberger Seenlandschaft ("Feldberg Lake District") is a municipality in the district of Mecklenburgische Seenplatte, in Mecklenburg-Vorpommern, Germany.

It is situated in the southeast of the district. The municipality is named after the Mecklenburg Lake District in the surrounding area with the lakes of Carwitzer See, Feldberger Haussee, Breiter Luzin and Schmaler Luzin.

In the immediate aftermath of the Second World War, the writer, Hans Fallada, who at the time was living in Feldberg, was appointed the town's interim mayor for 18 months.

Notable people
Irma Grese (Wrechen), Nazi SS Holocaust concentration camp supervisor executed for war crimes

See also
 Feldberg Lake District Nature Park

References

External links

Feldberg Lake District
Populated places established in 1919
Grand Duchy of Mecklenburg-Strelitz